A refrigerator truck or chiller lorry (also called a Reefer), is a van or truck designed to carry perishable freight at low temperatures. Most long-distance refrigerated transport by truck is done in articulated trucks pulling refrigerated semi-trailers. Sometimes they are used to carry dead human beings.

History 
The first successful mechanically refrigerated trucks were made for the ice cream industry in 1925. African American inventor Frederick McKinley Jones is known to be the first person to invent a refrigerated truck. There were around 4 million refrigerated road vehicles in use in 2010 worldwide.

Features 
Like refrigerator cars, refrigerated trucks differ from simple insulated and ventilated vans (commonly used for transporting fruit), neither of which are fitted with cooling apparatus. 

Refrigerator trucks can be ice-cooled, equipped with any one of a variety of mechanical refrigeration systems powered by small displacement diesel engines, or utilize carbon dioxide (either as dry ice or in liquid form) as a cooling agent. They are often equipped with small "vent doors" at the rear and front of the trailer. The purpose of these doors is to be kept open while hauling non-refrigerated cargo (often "backhaul"), so as to air out the trailer.

See also

 Cold chain
 Fuel cell auxiliary power unit
 Reefer (container)
 Reefer ship
 Refrigerated van
 Refrigerator car
Temperature data logger

References

Bibliography 
 Prentice, B. E., & Benell, D. (1992). "Determinants of empty returns by US refrigerated trucks: conjoint analysis approach". Canadian Journal of Agricultural Economics/Revue canadienne d'agroeconomie, 40(1), 109-127.  (abstract).

External links
 Guideline for long refrigerated trailers in Queensland  // Queensland Government, August 2006
 Heat and Mass Transfer: Fundamentals and Applications, 4/e,  (2011) Chapter 17-8 "Transportation of Refrigerated Foods" page 17-41
 UNIT 7 AIR CONDITIONING EQUIPMENT AND THEIR APPLICATIONS // IGNOU, School of Engineering & Technology, BME - 032; chapter 7.5 TRANSPORT REFRIGERATION - section "7.5.1 Refrigerated Trucks and Trailers", page 103

Trucks
Cooling technology
Food preservation
Trucks